Ann-Mari Edvardsen (born 6 November 1973 in Trondheim) is a Norwegian coloratura soprano opera singer and keyboardist. She is best known as the former vocalist of Norwegian doom metal/avant-garde band The 3rd and the Mortal from 1995 to 1997 and for Tactile Gemma from 1997 to 2001.

Along with a career in metal music, she also has a career in opera music as well. She has musical experience from Trøndelag Conservatory of Music and the University College of Opera in Stockholm.

Musical career

1995–1997: The 3rd and the Mortal
After the departure of Kari Rueslåtten, a friend of Edvardsen from school told her about their search for a new voice. She was brought to their rehearsal without them knowing, believing that the band already knew about her audition. After a jam session to the track that later got the title "Neurosis", Edvardsen became their new singer the same day, they didn't try anybody else.

Edvardsen debuted with The 3rd and the Mortal in their 1995 EP Nightswan. A year later, the band released their second full-length album Painting on Glass, but on this album, it featured little to no metal compared to their previous album and was more experimental. The band furthered explored more in the experimental genre in their next release In This Room in 1997, the album's single Stream became a popular song on the radio in Trondheim, receiving more recognition.

Some time later that year after the release and tour, Edvardsen departed from the band due pursue a career in opera.

Other works
In 2001, Edvardsen was a session lead vocalist for Italian progressive metal band Novembre in the album Novembrine Waltz covering Cloudbusting by Kate Bush. In 2005, she was again a session vocalist for Norwegian death metal band Antestor in the album The Forsaken.

Personal life
She is sisters with Monika Edvardsen, who is a former vocalist of Atrox and who also formed Tactile Gemma.

During her studies in Stockholm, she met her husband and got married back in Norway. She has five children, born between 2005 and 2013 in her marriage.

Discography

With The 3rd and the Mortal
Studio Albums:
Painting on Glass (1996)
In This Room (1997)

Singles:
Stream (1996)

EPs:
Nightswan (1995)

With Tactile Gemma
Demos:
Tactile Gemma demo (1998)

Studio Albums:
Tactile Gemma (2001)

As a guest/session musician
Novembre: Novembrine Waltz (2001) – guest vocals on "Cloudbusting" (Kate Bush cover)
 Antestor: The Forsaken (2005) – session vocalist
 Autumn Tears: The Glow of Desperation (2021) - guest vocals on "The Voice of Spring"

Operas
Source:
Bajazzo
Carmina Burana
La Boheme

References

Living people
Women heavy metal singers
Norwegian heavy metal singers
Norwegian musicians
Norwegian operatic sopranos
1973 births
Musicians from Trondheim
21st-century Norwegian singers
21st-century Norwegian women singers
The 3rd and the Mortal members
Antestor members